Herviera patricia is a species of sea snail, a marine gastropod mollusk in the family Pyramidellidae, the pyrams and their allies.

Description
The length of the shell attains  2 mm.

Distribution
This species occurs in the Indian Ocean off Réunion.

References

External links
 To World Register of Marine Species
 To ITIS
 

Pyramidellidae
Gastropods described in 1918